Jack (c. 2005 – November 6, 2011) was a Norwegian Forest cat, owed by	Karen Pascoe, who was lost on August 25, 2011 by American Airlines baggage handlers at John F. Kennedy International Airport before Hurricane Irene. A campaign called "Jack the Cat is Lost in AA Baggage at JFK" was started by animal lovers to help find him, with over 24,000 Friends of Jack joining the associated Facebook page. Almost two months after he went missing, the campaign designated October 22 "Jack the Cat Awareness Day".  The cat was found shortly afterwards on October 25 but was severely dehydrated and malnourished after his 61-day ordeal. Due to infection and injury, Jack was euthanized on November 6, 2011.

Disappearance

The clerk responsible for transporting the kennels to the FIS area loaded one kennel on top of another, and while the kennels were stationary and waiting to be loaded on the aircraft, the kennel positioned on the top fell to the ground.  The impact of the fall caused the kennel to separate and the cat escaped.

Search
The entire FIS area, where this occurred, was searched and efforts to immediately locate “Jack” were unsuccessful.  Subsequent efforts to locate Jack have also been unsuccessful.  Some of the efforts taken by AA to locate Jack include: posting photos of Jack in key areas around JFK and local businesses, consulting with the Mayor’s Alliance Society to set up humane traps on the airport property, consulting with the port authority and wildlife management representatives, hiring a professional “pet tracker” and issuing a “Pet Amber Alert”.

Discovery
On October 25, 61 days later, Jack fell through the ceiling in the customs area.

Death
Jack's death was announced on Facebook:
It is with tears that I must tell you that Jack has gone over the rainbow bridge.  (continued in 1st comment) He was with Karen yesterday, and his condition was worsening.  He was treated overnight, and she (and I) both had extensive conversations with the vets at Blue Pearl (BluePearl Veterinary Partners) regarding his condition.  Jack had extensive wounds on the back of his body, and the wounds were unable to heal because his skin had deteriorated due to the malnutrition that occurred while he was lost.  Despite antibiotics, the infections were worsening, and his skin was continuing to deteriorate.  He needed surgery to treat the wounds, but there was not enough available skin to close the wounds after the surgery.  The vet compared his skin condition to having severe burns over 50-60% of his body.  The vet was very clear that she had conferred with every possible doctor regarding options for Jack, but none of them left him with a substantial chance of survival and all of them involved him suffering.  Jack had been through so much, and the last thing anyone wanted was for him to suffer more.  Jack was bathed in love and crossed over just a few minutes ago.

See also

List of individual cats
Pet travel
Willow (cat)

References

External links
Jack The Cat is Lost in AA Baggage at JFK on Facebook

2011 animal deaths
Individual cats in the United States
Male mammals